The Swimming competition at the 2005 West Asian Games took place December 2–5 at the Hamad Aquatic Centre in Doha, Qatar. It featured 29 events (19 male, 10 female), all conducted in a long course (50m) pool.

Medalists

Men

Women

Medal table

References

External links
Official website (archived)

2005 West Asian Games
2005 in swimming
2005